"Leave Me Lonely" is a song written and recorded by American country music artist Gary Morris.  It was released in October 1986 as the second single from the album Plain Brown Wrapper.  The song was Morris' fourth and final number one on the country chart as a solo artist.  The single went to number one for one week and spent a total of fifteen weeks on the country chart.

Charts

Weekly charts

Year-end charts

References

1986 singles
Gary Morris songs
Warner Records singles
1986 songs
Songs written by Gary Morris